Télévision Togolaise is the national broadcaster of the West African state of Togo. Télévision Togolaise is headquartered in the capital city, Lomé.

It was founded on July 31, 1973.

History
It was in 1969 that the Togolese government officially took the decision to provide the country with a national television channel in order to promote information, education and entertainment for the population. However, it was not until July 31, 1973 that President Gnassingbé Eyadéma inaugurated the Togolese television studios - officially called Radio-Television de la Nouvelle Marche (RTNM) - and the first broadcasts of this new medium were broadcast. While initially only the Lomé region was covered, the creation of new transmitters in the interior of the country in Agou, Dapaong and more recently in Badou and Atakpamé has made it possible to considerably extend the national television broadcasting area.

In 1981, Togolese television began its first color broadcasts in the SECAM format. In 1990, it took the name of Télévision Togolaise (TVT), still in use today.

See also
 Media of Togo

References

External links
Official website

Television stations in Togo
Publicly funded broadcasters
Television channels and stations established in 1973
State media